Aivars Endziņš (born 8 December 1940, in Riga) is a Latvian lawyer and politician.
He graduated from the University of Latvia in 1968 and in 1977 attained a candidate of legal sciences degree. In 1997 he became a Doctor of Jurisprudence. He has worked as a lecturer at the University of Latvia and at the Turība School of Business Administration. He was a member of the Communist Party of the Soviet Union from 1963 to 1990, when he became a member of the Popular Front of Latvia and a member of the Supreme Council of the Republic of Latvia. He was a member of the 5th and 6th Saeimas, but resigned in 1996 to become a judge on the Constitutional Court of Latvia. He became the Chief Justice of the Constitutional Court in 2000 and left this office in 2007. He was a presidential candidate in the 2007 Latvian presidential election, nominated by Harmony Centre and supported by the New Era Party and the political alliance For Human Rights in a United Latvia. After a passionate debate over his membership of the Communist Party, which included a revelation that in the 1970s he had denied the occupation of Latvia, he lost the election to Valdis Zatlers.

References

1940 births
Living people
Lawyers from Riga
Communist Party of Latvia politicians
Latvian Social Democratic Workers' Party politicians
Latvian Way politicians
Deputies of the Supreme Council of the Republic of Latvia
Deputies of the 5th Saeima
Deputies of the 6th Saeima
Candidates for President of Latvia
Judges of the Constitutional Court of Latvia
Latvian legal scholars
University of Latvia alumni
Politicians from Riga
20th-century Latvian judges
21st-century Latvian judges